They Fired with Their Lives (Spanish: Con la vida hicieron fuego) is a 1959 Spanish war film directed by and starring Ana Mariscal. It is set against the backdrop of the Spanish Civil War.

Cast

References

Bibliography 
 Bentley, Bernard. A Companion to Spanish Cinema. Boydell & Brewer 2008.

External links 
 

1959 war films
Spanish war films
1959 films
1950s Spanish-language films
Films directed by Ana Mariscal
1950s Spanish films